Johann Augustin Pucher ( or Ivan Pucher; August 26, 1814 – August 7, 1864) was a Slovene priest, scientist, photographer, artist, and poet who invented an unusual process for making photographs on glass.

Although his were not the first glass photographs, Pucher's process was unique. It was the only 19th-century photography technique that was not based on expensive silver halide chemistry but was still sensitive enough to use in a camera, with exposure times comparable to those of the daguerreotype and calotype. (Other non-silver processes, such as the cyanotype, were practical only for making prints or photograms in direct sunlight.) Modern testing of Pucher's photographs has confirmed their chemically unusual nature. However, his process was never commercialized, and attempts to recreate it based on published information have been unsuccessful.

Biography 
Pucher was born on August 26, 1814 in Kranj in the Duchy of Carniola in the Austrian Empire (now Slovenia). He was the son of Joseph Pucher and Maria Lebar Pucher, and he was baptized Augustin Johann Pucher.

As a schoolchild, Pucher was interested in art, languages, and the natural sciences, especially chemistry and physics. He wanted to study art, but obeyed his mother's wish and became a Catholic priest. However, he continued to experiment in photography, art, and music. When the French Academy of Sciences announced the invention of the daguerreotype on 19 August 1839, Pucher quickly mastered the process, but it was too expensive, so he developed his own way of making photographs. On April 19, 1842, he invented a photographic process on glass that he called the hyalotype, or "svetlopis" in Slovene. His photos are also called puharotypes, in his honor. The first report about his invention was published in the newspaper Carniolia in 1841.

While living in Bled, Pucher met a French viscount, Louis de Dax, who wrote about him in the Parisian magazine La Lumière. The church then moved Pucher to a small village, Cerklje, where his contacts abroad lessened. Ultimately, he became sick from the harmful substances used in his experiments and died at the age of 49.

Hyalotype process 

According to Pucher's records of his photographic process, he coated a small glass plate with a layer of light-sensitive sulfur, exposed it to iodine vapors, and inserted the prepared plate into a camera. He then poured mercury into a metal container, placed the mercury at the bottom of the camera, and heated it from below. He exposed the prepared plate to light for 15 seconds, and mercury vapors coated the exposed places on the picture. Pucher strengthened the picture with bromine steam and fixed it by wrapping it with alcohol. Finally, he preserved the photo with varnish.

The advantages of Pucher's procedure included a shorter exposure time (15 seconds, which allowed him to make portraits), a positive image, and the possibility of reproduction.

Pucher was not the first to try to create photos on glass: A Frenchman, Abel Niépce de Saint-Victor, reported his own invention to the French Academy of Sciences in 1847. It was not until January 1851 that the Austrian Academy of Sciences published a report on Pucher's method.

Surviving work 
Known photos by Pucher, mostly kept in the National Museum of Slovenia and in the Museum of Architecture and Design in Ljubljana, are:
 Self-portrait, reproduction of a lost original, National Museum
 Self-portrait, original on glass, 10 × 12 cm, National Museum
 Portrait of a man, original on glass, 9.4 × 11.5 cm, National Museum
 Portrait of a woman, original on glass, 10.3 × 12.1 cm, National Museum
 Andrej Vavken in Cerklje na Gorenjskem, original on glass, 6.7 × 8.4 cm, Museum of Architecture and Design
 Portrait of the composer Andrej Vavken and the painter Ivan Franke, original on glass, 9.7 × 11.5 cm, private collection

Reproductions 
 Bled island, colored photo reproduction of a graphic motif on paper, 6.5 × 5.1 cm, National Museum 
 Last Supper, colored photo reproduction of a graphic motif on paper, 7.8 × 6 cm, National Museum 
 Gregor Rihar in a boat in Bled, photo reproduction of a drawing on paper, 9.1 × 6.3 cm, National Museum

Lost photos 
Most of Pucher's photos have been lost, including:
 2 sent to a scientific assembly in Ljubljana in 1849
 4 sent to Viscount Louis de Dax
 Photographs sent to the Austrian Academy of Sciences
 Photographs presented at world exhibitions in London, New York, and Paris
 Portraits of relatives destroyed during World War II

Poetry 
Pucher wrote at least 15 poems in Slovene and 4 in German. Some of them were set to music by prominent composers.

Awards and honors 
In recognition of Pucher's contribution to the Slovene national identity and the development of photographic science, Slovenia declared 2014 to be Pucher's Year. The honorary patronage of the jubilee was approved by President Borut Pahor. A yearlong program of events in Slovenia and abroad was organized in cooperation with many municipalities and institutions to celebrate the 200th anniversary of his birth.

Several items and locations are named after Pucher:
 Janez Pucher Award, given by the Photographic Federation of Slovenia (Slovene: Fotografska zveza Slovenije) for exceptional achievement in photography
 Puharotype, Pucher’s photo procedure
 Puharjeva ulica, a street in Ljubljana
 Puharjeva ulica, a street in Kranj
 Pucher Prize, given by the Janez Puhar Photo Society in Kranj (Slovene: Fotografsko društvo Janez Puhar Kranj)
 Pucher Medal, given by the Janez Puhar Photo Society in Kranj for the best portrait at International Federation of Photographic Art (FIAP) exhibitions

Notes

References

External links

Puhar.si A site dedicated to Pucher.

1814 births
1864 deaths
Artists from Kranj
Carniolan Roman Catholic priests
Carniolan photographers
19th-century Austrian photographers
Carniolan painters
Carniolan Catholic poets
Carniolan inventors
19th-century poets
19th-century painters
19th-century Carniolan writers
19th-century Austrian Roman Catholic priests